Atlantis FC is a Finnish football club, based in Helsinki. It currently plays in the third tier of Finnish football (Kakkonen).

History
The club was founded in late 1995 when Johanneksen Dynamo (founded 1980) and FC Norssi (founded 1985) merged. The name "Atlantis FC" was created by Gösta Sundqvist, singer of Leevi and the Leavings.

The team began to play in the third tier of Finnish football (the Kakkonen) in 1996 and in 1997 they were promoted to the Ykkönen. In 1999 the club reached the playoffs for promotion to the first tier (Veikkausliiga, or betting league in English, named for its sponsor) but lost to Vaasan Palloseura. The following year they achieved promotion to the Veikkausliiga. In 2001 Atlantis finished seventh in the league and won the Finnish Cup.

The club fell into financial difficulties and went bankrupt 2002 and their place in the Premier League was given to AC Allianssi. The club's reserve team is Atlantis Akatemia (Atlantis Academy) still continued in second division. 2003 it changed its name to Atlantis FC and in 2004 the club was promoted to the Ykkönen.

Atlantis' current manager is Markku Ritala and they play their home matches at Helsingin Pallokenttä. Sakari Tukiainen finished the season 2014 as the top goal scorer and setting a new league record with 40 goals for the Kakkonen.

Current squad

Staff

Management
Chairman:  Markku Ritala
General Manager:  Aarne Tenkanen
Director of Academy:  Janne Wikman

Sports
Head Coach: Abdulaziz Moshood Bola
Goalkeeper Coach:  Mamadou Vito Diatta
Technical Coach:  Sunny Akintmehin

Medical
Masseur:  Jukka Ala-Nikkola
Kit manager:  Christopher Aruna
Physio:  Filip Lunabba

Retired numbers

Seasons
1980:	piiri IV, 3.
1981:	piiri III, 1.
1982:	V div., 3.
1983:	V div., 2.
1984:	IV div., 5.
1985:	IV div., 2.
1986:	IV div., 4.
1987:	IV div., 4.
1988:	IV div., 2.
1989:	IV div., 7.
1990:	IV div., 3.
1991:	IV div., 6.
1992:	IV div., 1.
1993:	Kolmonen, 5. 	Finnish Cup Final
1994:	Kolmonen, 4.
1995:	Kolmonen, 2. Promotion
1996:	Kakkonen, 3.
1997:	Kakkonen, 1. Promotion
1998:	Ykkönen, 5.
1999:	Ykkönen, 2.
2000:	Ykkönen, 4. Ykköscup Winner
2001:	Veikkausliiga, 7. 	Finnish Cup Winner
2002:	Kakkonen, 10.
2003:	Kakkonen, 3. 	Kakkoscup Winner
2004:	Kakkonen, 1. Promotion
2005:	Ykkönen, 7.
2006:	Ykkönen, 3.
2007:	Ykkönen, 7.
2008:	Ykkönen, 11.
2009:	Ykkönen, 13.

Former coaches
1980–1983:	Juha Leinonen
1984–1986:	Hannu Ylöstalo
1987:	Hannu Tuukkanen
1988–1989:	Mikko Viitamäki
1990–1991:	Jari Kurittu
1992–1993:	Mikko Viitamäki
1994:	Esko Kokkonen
1995:	Ari Tiittanen
1996–2000:	Jari Europaeus
2000:	Markku Palmroos
2001:	Ari Tiittanen
2002:	Timo Askolin
2003–2007:	Pasi Pihamaa
2007:	Ville Lyytikäinen
2008:	 Abdou Talat
2008:	Pasi Pihamaa
2009:       Aavo Sarap
2010:  Moshood Bola Abdulaziz
2011: Mikko Lappalainen & Unto Virkkala
2012: Unto Virkkala &  Alan Arruda
2013: Mikko Lappalainen
2014:  Alan Arruda
2015: Ari Asukka
2016: Markku Palmroos & Tom Weckström
2017:  Alan Arruda
2018:  Abdulaziz Moshood Bola

Player of the year
1996:	Marko Ignatius
1997:	Esa Pamppunen
1998:	Kimmo Tauriainen
1999:	Tero Pilvi
2000:	Pasi Solehmainen
2001:	Sami Ylä-Jussila
2002:	Mika Johansson
2003:	Henri Kokkonen
2004:	Juha Jussila
2005:	Risto Salmi
2006:	Adel Eid
2007:	Risto Salmi
2008:      Ernest Simon
2009:      Tomas Sirevicius
2010:      Alan Arruda
2011:      Alimamy Jalloh
2012:      Mohamed Fofana
2013:      Alimamy Jalloh
2014:      Jussi Äijälä
2015:      Pierre Nlate
2016:      Pierre Nlate

Topscorer
1980:	Kari Nevala	(9)
1981:	Kari Nevala	(8)
1982:	Hannu Vallius	(12)
1983:	Kari Nevala	(12)
1984:	Kari Nevala	(22)
1985:	Kari Nevala	(14)
1986:	Kari Nevala	(11)
1987:	Jukka Innanen	(10)
1988:	Jorma Lempinen	(12)
1989:	Jorma Lempinen	(12)
1990:	Kari Nevala	(10)
1991:	Jouko Mikkonen & Henri Taavitsainen	(7)
1992:	Esa Pamppunen	(28)
1993:	Esa Pamppunen	(17)
1994:	Esa Pamppunen	(17)
1995:	Esa Pamppunen	(19)
1996:	Esa Pamppunen	(12)
1997:	Jani Nieminen & Esa Pamppunen	(10)
1998:	Kimmo Tauriainen	(8)
1999:	Tero Pilvi	(9)
2000:	Sukru Uzuner	(19)
2001:	Sami Ylä-Jussila	(12)
2002:	Eero Voipio	(8)
2003:	Eero Voipio	(7)
2004:	Eero Voipio	(12)
2005:	Vesa Kosonen	(13)
2006:	Feras Abid ja Petteri Paajanen(11)
2007:	Muwahid Sesay	(9)
2008:	Kalle Vasse	(7)
2009:      Zakaria Kibona (6)
2010:      Bobo Bola (11)
2011:      Victor Solomon (14)
2012:      Victor Solomon & Abdul Sesay (12)
2013:      Misse Eboungue (16)
2014:      Sakari Tukiainen (41)
2015:      Samuel Chidi (7)
2016:      Shaggy Kimuenimeso & Juuso Leimu (4)

Highest Attendances by season
1996:	17 August 1996	Atlantis FC – PK-35	228
1997:	13 September 1997	Atlantis FC – EIF	213
1998:	16 June 1998	Atlantis FC – FC Lahti	427
1999:	14 October 1999	Atlantis FC – Tampere United	1.243
2000:	30 September 2000	Atlantis FC – KuPS	1.768
2001:	4 May 2001	Atlantis FC – FC Haka	2.797
2002:	11 July 2002	Atlantis FC – Exeter City	325
2003:	1 July 2003	Atlantis FC – FCK Salamat	358
2004:	26 September 2004	Atlantis FC – JIPPO	512
2005:	2 August 2005	Atlantis FC – PK-35	746
2006:	2 September 2006	Atlantis FC – TP-47	742
2007:	23 September 2007	Atlantis FC – KuPS	722
2008:	11 October 2008	Atlantis FC – JJK	835
2009:	3 May 2009        Atlantis FC – PoPa 623
2010:	23 July 2010        Atlantis FC – HIFK 289
2011:	10 May 2011        Atlantis FC – Pallohonka 241
2012:	25 April 2012        Atlantis FC – FC Honka 312
2013:	21 May 2013        Atlantis FC – KTP 215
2014:	18 October 2014        Atlantis FC – EIF 932
2015:	3 August 2015        Atlantis FC – FC Honka 327

Former Chairmen

Erkki Alaja

References

External links
Official website
Official Youth Academy website

 
Association football clubs established in 1995
Football clubs in Helsinki
1995 establishments in Finland